The Cathedral of St. Theresa of Avila (Serbian and) is a Roman Catholic cathedral and minor basilica located in Subotica, Serbia, the seat of the Diocese of Subotica. It is dedicated to Saint Theresa of Avila.

History
The cathedral was built between 1773 and 1779 in the baroque style. At the time, Subotica was part of the Habsburg monarchy. The building was designed by architect Franz Kaufmann from Pest. The altar is decorated with several paintings by Josef Schoefft, one painting of the Holy Family by Kasper Schleibne, and one painting of the True Cross by Emmanuel Walch.

On the roof of the building, between the two bell towers, is a statue of Virgin Mary. The pulpit was built in 1808. The pipe organ was installed in 1897 and renovated in 1997. New renovation works are planned for 2015.

The whole interior of the church was renovated in 1972-73 for the bicentennial of the building. The building was declared the Monument of Culture of Great Importance in 1973. Pope Paul VI granted the title of Minor basilica to the cathedral on 29 April 1974.

There is a bust of Aleksandar Lifka in front of the church.

See also
List of cathedrals in Serbia

References

External links
Official web site

Cathedrals in Vojvodina
Roman Catholic cathedrals in Serbia
Buildings and structures in Subotica
Roman Catholic churches in Vojvodina
Cultural Monuments of Great Importance (Serbia)
Baroque church buildings in Serbia